Tunku Annuar ibni Almarhum Sultan Badlishah PSM DKH DMK SPMK SSDK PSB (30 June 1937 – 21 May 2014) was a member of the Kedah royal family and Chairman of the Regency Council of the Malaysian state of Kedah. He was the son of Sultan Badlishah and the half-brother of Sultan Abdul Halim.

Biography
Tunku Annuar was born on 30 June 1937, the first son of Tunku Badlishah by his second wife, Tengku Asma Sultan Sulaiman. His father, Tunku Badlishah, was the seventh son of Sultan Abdul Hamid Halim. His mother, Tengku Asma, was a daughter of Sultan Sulaiman Badrul Alam Shah of Terengganu. She was crowned Sultanah of Kedah in 1943. Tunku Badlishah was appointed Raja Muda (Crown Prince) of Kedah in 1935 and became sultan in 1943. His full brother from the same father and mother was the current Sultan of Kedah, Tunku Sallehuddin.

Tunku Annuar was educated at Malay College Kuala Kangsar then pursue his study at Australian Army Staff College, Fort Queenscliff.  He was granted the title Tunku Bendahara in 1981.

On 12 December 2011, he was appointed Chairman of the Council of Regency after Tuanku Abdul Halim became Yang di-Pertuan Agong. Other members of the council include his brothers Tunku Sallehuddin, Tunku Abdul Hamid Thani, and Tuanku Abdul Halim's daughter Tunku Puteri Intan Safinaz.

Marriages and children
Tunku Annuar married Sharifah Saleha Syed Omar Shahabuddin on 22 January 1962. They had four children:

 Tunku Marina (18 October 1962)

 Tunku Putra Badlishah (born 6 September 1964), who married Wan Zainab Wan Mahmud (born 30 July 1964) on 5 February 1987 and has four children:
 Tunku Putri Nadia
 Tunku Intan Nazirah
 Tunku Asma Narissa
 Tunku Annuar Nazirshah
 Putri Alyssa Batrisha

 Tunku Azuddin Shah (born 1969), who married Paula Malai Ali (born 3 March 1974) on 23 September 2002. They divorced in 2006.Puan Anna Baris (b. 10 February 198x), educ. Lyceum No 7, and Tomsk State Pedagogical Univ (TSPU), Tomsk, Russia. He has issue, two sons and one daughter by his second wife:
 Y.M. Tunku Danil Badlishah bin Tunku Azudin Shah. b. 2010.
 Y.M. Tunku Kiril Badlishah bin Tunku Azudin Shah. b 2015
 Y.M. Tunku Ivanna binti Tunku Azudin Shah. b. July 2012

 Tunku Johanez (s/o Sharifa Saleha), educ. Sri Petaling Sch, Petaling Jaya, Selangor, and Malay Coll, Kuala Kangsar, Perak. Dir Client Services at Krakatua/ICOM 2010, MD Shahril Assocs Advertising & Design Sdn Bhd. Chair Felab Engineering Sdn Bhd, You Wings Sdn Bhd, and Masmeyer Success Sdn Bhd. Exec Chair Bumi Aviation Sdn Bhd. Mbr Royal Selangor Golf Club. Rcvd: DSDK (19.1.2014). m. (first) (div.) Che’ Wawa. m. (second) Y.A.Bhg. Datin Sophia binti ‘Abdu’llah, née Winnie Sophia Low, daughter Y.Bhg. Tan Sri Dato’ Low Kheng Huat, Chair Low Keng Huat (Singapore) Ltd, by his wife, Y.Bhg. Puan Sri Dato’ Molly Low. He has issue, three sons and one daughter (including triplets) by his second wife: 
 Tunku ... bin Tunku Johanez Mansur. b
 Tunku ... bin Tunku Johanez Mansur. 
 Tunku Jayden Jian bin Tunku Johanez Mansur. b. 10 July 2008. Mbr Kuala Lumpur Youth Soccer Club.
 Tunku ... binti Tunku Johanez Mansur.

His second wife was Toh Puan Noor Suzanna Abdullah, the Toh Puan Bendahara. Toh Puan Noor Suzanna has been involved in various charity events for flood victims in Kedah. The couple has one son. 

 Tunku Dato' Tunku Harunnarasheed Putra, who married Amelia Henderson on 14 August 2015, but divorced in 2018.

Death and funeral 
Tunku Annuar died at 12:20 am on 21 May 2014 at Pantai Hospital in Ipoh, Perak, of a heart attack. He was 74. His body was laid to rest at the Kedah Royal Mausoleum in Langgar, Kedah after Asr prayers.

Before his death, he was presumably thought to be the successor to the throne of Kedah, since the Raja Muda (Crown Prince) who his elder half-brother, Tunku Abdul Malik was considered incapacitated due to old age, and then the subsequent successors will follow his lineage. Due to his death, his descendants has been by-passed and since 16 December 2016, his younger brother, Tunku Sallehuddin was proclaimed the next heir and Raja Muda of Kedah.

Honours

Honours of Kedah 
He has been awarded:
  Member of the Halimi Family Order of Kedah (DKH) (16.7.2008)
  Member of the Supreme Order of Sri Mahawangsa (DMK)
  Knight Grand Commander of the Exalted Order of the Crown of Kedah (SPMK) – Dato' Seri 
  Knight Grand Companion of the Order of Loyalty to the Royal House of Kedah (SSDK) – Dato' Seri 
  Sultan Badlishah Medal for Faithful and Loyal Service (PSB)

His second wife, Noor Suzanna, Toh Puan Bendahara, was awarded :
  Knight Grand Companion of the Order of Loyalty to the Royal House of Kedah (SSDK) – Dato' Seri (12.12.2011)

Honours of Malaysia 
He has been awarded:
 
  Commander of the Order of Loyalty to the Crown of Malaysia  (PSM) – Tan Sri (2012)

Ancestry

References

1937 births
Malaysian people of Malay descent
Malaysian Muslims
2014 deaths
Annuar
Sons of monarchs

Members of the Halimi Family Order of Kedah
Members of the Supreme Order of Sri Mahawangsa
Knights Grand Commander of the Exalted Order of the Crown of Kedah

Commanders of the Order of Loyalty to the Crown of Malaysia